The Movement is the fourth and final studio album by American hip hop collective Mo Thugs. It was released June 10, 2003 via Riviera Entertainment. Production was handled by Mauly T, Thin C., Dirty Red, Denzo, DJ Skail, Mark Twayne, and The Platinum Brothers, with Aldy Damian and Layzie Bone serving as executive producers. The album peaked at number 25 on the Top R&B/Hip-Hop Albums and number 17 on the Independent Albums in the United States.

Track listing

Charts

References

External links

2003 albums
Mo Thugs albums